Threshold are an English progressive metal band formed in Surrey in the late 1980s.

History

1988–1992 
Threshold began their career in 1988, initially playing covers of metal groups like Ratt and Testament. As they continued playing together, they began to write their own songs, and eventually stopped playing covers altogether. Early recordings were released locally on cassette under the band name "If Not, Why?". They played their first gig at The Compasses in Egham, Surrey, with Jon Jeary on vocals and Ian Bennett on bass.  In 1992, they signed their first record deal, and after adding vocalist Damian Wilson to the group alongside guitarists Karl Groom and Nick Midson, bassist Jon Jeary and drummer Tony Grinham, produced their first commercial recording, "Intervention," which was released on a Dutch progressive rock compilation album. Shortly afterwards, keyboardist Richard West joined the band, and he remains with them to this day.
1993–1999
The band's debut album, Wounded Land, was released in 1993, taking its name and some thematic elements from Stephen R. Donaldson's novel of the same name. Wilson was unavailable to join the band for the follow-up tour, and so Glynn Morgan was recruited to replace him. He sang on the band's 1994 second recording, Psychedelicatessen, which spawned a music video for the song "Innocent," the band's first. The following year, Morgan and the band toured Europe and recorded some of their performances for the short live album, Livedelica.

Threshold took a break before their next effort, during which time Morgan and then-drummer Jay Micciche left to form Mindfeed. Rather than finding an unknown singer to replace him, the band turned again to Damian Wilson, and together they recorded 1997's Extinct Instinct. They followed this with another tour of Europe, this time supported by Enchant. Additionally, Johanne James, the band's current drummer, played with them for the first time during this tour. Wilson was unavailable for their next album, so former Sargant Fury vocalist Andrew "Mac" McDermott, joined to record Clone and would remain with them until 2007.

2000–2005 
In 2001, Threshold released Hypothetical, which saw Johanne James firmly cemented as the band's permanent drummer. Another lineup change occurred in 2003, when bassist Jon Jeary left and was replaced by Steve Anderson. Around this time the band also re-released their first three studio albums in Special Editions, with bonus tracks, a remastered sound, expanded liner notes and, in the case of Wounded Land and Psychedelicatessen, special CD-ROM content. Their newer albums, starting with Hypothetical, were released in Limited Editions, with similar bonus content. The albums Critical Mass (2002) and Subsurface (2004) followed, interspersed by the double live album and DVD Critical Energy.

2006–2011 
Threshold left their longtime label, InsideOut Music, in 2006 to join Nuclear Blast Records. Guitarist Nick Midson left the band in early 2007 for unknown reasons. The band released Dead Reckoning which spawned a music video for an edit of the song "Pilot in the Sky of Dreams". The song also appeared on the 2008 movie soundtrack In the Name of the King: A Dungeon Siege Tale. This marks the first occasion of a song by the band appearing in a motion picture. In July 2007 vocalist Mac left the band and original singer Damian Wilson returned as Threshold's frontman for the first time in nearly a decade for the band's tour dates which extended into 2009. Pete Morten replaced Midson as guitarist for the tour and later albums. InsideOut Music released the first official Threshold compilation in November 2007. The album The Ravages of Time is a two-disc set covering all of the band's official albums from Wounded Land to Dead Reckoning. In 2009 the band released a limited edition eight-disc singles box set, including previously unreleased b-sides and brand new re-recordings of old demo songs released in other forms before, including Smile at the Moon, (which was debuted live on the 2009 Essence of Progression Tour), Shifting Sands, Half Way Home and Fist of Tongues. On 3 August 2011, former vocalist Andrew McDermott died of kidney failure.

2012–2017 
On 24 August 2012, Nuclear Blast announced the release of March of Progress. It was the first album to feature Damian Wilson on vocals since 1997. The album was followed on 19 September 2014 by the band's tenth studio album For the Journey. The following year the band released the double live album "European Journey" recorded during their November 2014 tour. In February 2017, Pete Morten left Threshold to focus on his own projects, and the following month Threshold announced that they had parted ways with Damian Wilson.

2017–present 
Glynn Morgan, the band's former vocalist from 1994 to 1996 replaced Damian Wilson for the album Legends of the Shires released in September 2017. The album entered the top 20 of the national album charts in Germany and Switzerland and spawned a music video for the song "Small Dark Lines". The following year the band released the live album "Two-Zero-One-Seven" recorded during their 2017 European tour. In July 2021 Threshold announced that they were back in the studio recording their twelfth studio album, teasing that "if Legends of the Shires had a slightly darker, moodier older brother then this would be it". In July 2022, the band announced their 12th album would be titled Dividing Lines, and it was released on 18 November 2022.

Personnel 

Current members
 Karl Groom – lead guitar, backing vocals (1988–present), keyboards (1988–1992)
 Richard West – keyboards, backing vocals (1992–present)
 Johanne James – drums (2000–present)
 Steve Anderson – bass, backing vocals (2003–present)
 Glynn Morgan – lead vocals (1993–1996, 2017–present), rhythm guitar (2017–present)

Former members
 Nick Midson – rhythm guitar (1988–2006)
 Jon Jeary – lead vocals (1988–1992; studio guest 2017), bass, acoustic guitar (1990–2003), backing vocals (1992–2003)
 Tony Grinham – drums (1988–1993)
 Pete Crawford – bass (1989–1990)
 Ian Bennett – bass (1988–1989)
 Nick Harradence – drums (1993–1994)
 Jay Micciche – drums (1994–1996)
 Mark Heaney – drums (1996–2000)
 Andrew "Mac" McDermott – lead vocals (1998–2007; died 2011)
 Pete Morten – rhythm guitar, occasional backing vocals (2007–2017)
 Damian Wilson – lead vocals (1992–1993, 1996–1998, 2007–2017)

Timeline

Discography

Studio albums

Compilations 
 The Ravages of Time – The Best of Threshold (2007)

Live albums 
 Livedelica (1995) – also included in Special Edition of Psychedelicatessen
 Concert in Paris (2002)
 Critical Energy (2004, 2CDs) – also included in Special Edition containing both 2CD and DVD versions
 Surface to Stage (2006) – also reissued as a 2CD Expanded Edition with extra tracks in 2021.
 European Journey (2015)
 Two-Zero-One-Seven (2018)

DVD 
 Critical Energy (2004)

Singles 
 "Paradox"
 "Sunseeker"
 "Innocent"
 "Virtual Isolation"
 "Freaks"
 "Light and Space"
 "Phenomenon"
 "Mission Profile"
 "Pressure"
 "Pilot in the Sky of Dreams"
 "Supermassive Black Hole"
 "Watchtower on the Moon" (2014)
 "Turned to Dust" (2014)
 "Unforgiven" (2014)
 "Lost in Translation" (2017)
 "Small Dark Lines" (2017)
 "Stars and Satellites" (2017)
 "Silenced" (2022)
 "King Of Nothing" (2022)
 "Complex" (2022)
 "Haunted" (2022)

Music videos 
 Innocent (1994)
 Fragmentation (acoustic version) (2003)
 Pressure (2004)
 Pilot in the Sky of Dreams (2007)
 Staring at the Sun (2013)
 Unforgiven (2014)
 Small Dark Lines (2017)
 Silenced (2022)

Remixes and rarities album 
 Decadent (1999) – remixes and radio edits
 Wireless: Acoustic Sessions (2003) – acoustic recordings
 Replica (2004) – alternative versions and previously unreleased songs
 Paradox: The Singles Collection (2009) – eight CD singles box set

References

External links 

Official website
Threshold on Facebook

English progressive metal musical groups
Musical groups established in 1988
Nuclear Blast artists
Inside Out Music artists